Solva marginata, also known as the drab wood-soldierfly, is a species of soldier fly in the family Xylomyidae, the "wood soldier flies".

Description
The body is mostly blackish. The tip of the thorax has some bright yellow markings. The abdomen has pale, narrow bands, and bright yellow markings. It has short, multi-segmented antennae, and looks similar to the sawfly.

Distribution
Austria, France, China, Denmark, England, Germany, Mongolia, Netherlands, Poland, Russia, Sweden, Ukraine.
This species is widespread in the United Kingdom, but considered scarce and uncommon. It is found mostly in specific local areas in southeast England, East Anglia and East Midlands.

Habitat
This fly is associated with the poplar tree. The larvae live under bark, feeding on rotting wood.

References

External links

 Image
 Image
 Image (top view)

Xylomyidae
Taxa named by Johann Wilhelm Meigen
Diptera of Europe
Diptera of Asia
Insects described in 1820